Tiber may refer to:
Tiber, the Italian river that flows through Rome
Tiber Island, the island in the Tiber River in Rome
Tiber Valley Project, the project conducted by the British School in Rome
Tiber Apollo, the marble sculpture of Apollo recovered from the Tiber River
Tiber Creek, the tributary of the Potomac River in Washington, D.C.
Mad River (Ohio), the stream in Ohio also known as Tiber River
Tiber Dam, the dam on the Marias River in Montana
Lake Elwell, the lake in Montana also known as Tiber Reservoir
Tiber Rocks, the group of rocks off the west coast of Graham Land
Tiber Oil Field, the deepwater offshore oil field located in the Gulf of Mexico
Tiber station, the light rail station in Sacramento, California
River Tiber (musician), the Canadian R&B singer

See also
Tver, city in Russia
 Il Tevere, daily Italian Fascist newspaper (1924–1943)